This article contains a list of kings of Rwanda. The Kingdom of Rwanda was ruled by sovereigns titled mwami (plural abami), and was one of the oldest and the most centralized kingdom in the history of Central and East Africa.

Its state and affairs before King Gihanga I is largely unconfirmed and highly shrouded in mythical tales.

Kings of Rwanda

Abami b'imishumi (descendants of Ibimanuka gods) – B.C.E
 Gihanga I
 Kanyarwanda I Gahima I
 Kimari Cya Rurenge
 Ndahiro I Bamara (Wamala)
 Ruganzu I
 Nyarume
 Ntarama
 Rubanda (Lugalbanda) 
 Rumeza I
 Yuhi I Musindi
 Rumeza II
 Ndahiro II Ruyange
 Ndahiro III Ndoba
 Ndahiro IV Samembe
 Nsoro I Samukondo
 Nsoro II Byinshi
 Ruganzu II Bwimba
 Cyilima I Rugwe
 
1st Abami Bibitekerezo (1st Common Era Kings)
 Kigeli I Mukobanya
 Mibambwe I Sekarongoro I Mutabazi
 Yuhi II Gahima II
 Ndahiro V Cyamatare

2nd Abami Bibitekerezo (2nd Common Era Kings)

 Ruganzu III Ndoli
 Kalemera Rwaka
 Mutara I Nsoro III Semugeshi
 Kigeli II Nyamuheshera (1576–1609)
 Mibamwe II Sekarongoro II Gisanura (1609–1642)
 Yuhi III Mazimpaka (1642–1675)
 Cyilima II Rujugira (1675–1708)
 Kigeli III Ndabarasa (1708–1741)
 Mibambwe III Mutabazi II Sentabyo (1741–1746)
 Yuhi IV Gahindiro (1746–1802)
 Mutara II Rwogera (1802–1853)
 Kigeli IV Rwabugiri (1853 – November 1895)
 Mibambwe IV Rutarindwa (November 1895 – December 1896)
 Yuhi V Musinga (1883 – 13 January 1944)
 Mutara III Rudahigwa (March 1911 – 25 July 1959)
 Kigeli V Ndahindurwa (29 June 1936 – 16 October 2016)

Since 1961

On 28 January 1961, during the Rwandan Revolution, the country abolished its monarchy and became a republic (retroactively approved by a referendum held on 25 September of the same year). Afterwards, Kigeli V Ndahindurwa continued to maintain his claim to the throne until his death on 16 October 2016 in Washington, D.C. On 9 January 2017, the Royal Council of Abiru announced Prince Emmanuel Bushayija as the new heir to the throne. Prince Emmanuel adopted the regnal name Yuhi VI.

See also

 History of Rwanda
 Kingdom of Rwanda
 List of presidents of Rwanda
 Prime Minister of Rwanda

References

Rwanda
Rwandan monarchy
 
Kings
Kings